Husvær Chapel is a chapel of the Church of Norway in Herøy Municipality in Nordland county, Norway. It is located in the Husvær island group. It is an annex chapel in the Herøy parish which is part of the Nord-Helgeland prosti (deanery) in the Diocese of Sør-Hålogaland. The wooden chapel was built in a long church style in 1936 using plans drawn up by the architects Otto Edvardsen and Peder Andersen. The chapel seats about 80 people.

See also
List of churches in Sør-Hålogaland

References

Herøy, Nordland
Churches in Nordland
Wooden churches in Norway
20th-century Church of Norway church buildings
Churches completed in 1936
1936 establishments in Norway
Long churches in Norway